The Oath of Citizenship, as opposed to the Oath of Allegiance, is for new New Zealand citizens to pledge loyalty to the King of New Zealand, Charles III, and faithfully observe to the laws of New Zealand.

Oath 
The Oath, recited by citizenship recipients in New Zealand, is as follows:

The oath of citizenship in Māori (known as Te Oati Haumi) is as follows (without macrons):

The Oath of citizenship may be recited either in English or in Māori.

Affirmation 
Those who object to adding 'God' to the end of an oath, may choose instead to make an Affirmation:

In Māori (called Te Whakautanga Haumi), this is (without macrons),

Citizenship ceremony

When an application for New Zealand citizenship is granted, applicants are required to attend a public citizenship ceremony.

Citizenship ceremonies were first held in 1954. Since 1955, groups of new citizens have publicly sworn allegiance to the Queen. New citizens from Commonwealth realms could take the oath in writing and get their certificates by post until 1996, when applicants were required to attend a public ceremony.

The public ceremony is a very important step in the process of becoming a New Zealand citizen. It is an opportunity for new citizens to publicly declare their allegiance to their new country and for the local community to welcome them on behalf of all New Zealanders. Here, applicants stand before an official person (normally the local Mayor) and take the Oath or Affirmation of Allegiance.

In doing so, applicants declare that they applicants will honour Charles the III, King of New Zealand (or if the oath is recited solely in Māori, to pledge to Kīngi Tiāre te Tuatoru, te Kīngi o Aotearoa), obey the laws of New Zealand and be a good citizen. It is only after swearing allegiance that applicants become a New Zealand citizen, and are presented with a Citizenship Certificate from the local mayor (or government officials in a private ceremony in the absence of the Mayoral ceremony). New citizens then join in the singing of God Defend New Zealand before enjoying a cup of tea or glass of wine, normally following the Loyal toast.

See also 
 New Zealand nationality law
 Monarchy in New Zealand
 Oath of Allegiance (New Zealand)

References

External links
 New Zealand Citizenship – Department of Internal Affairs website.
 Citizenship Act 1977

New Zealand
Government of New Zealand
Monarchy in New Zealand
New Zealand nationality law